Protect the Boss is a 2011 South Korean workplace romantic comedy television series starring Choi Kang-hee, Ji Sung, Kim Jae-joong, Wang Ji-hye, and Park Yeong-gyu. It aired on SBS from August 3 to September 29, 2011 on Wednesdays and Thursdays at 21:55.

Plot
Cha Ji-heon (Ji Sung) is an incredibly immature young man who is useless at his job as a director at DN Group, where the chairman is his father (Park Yeong-gyu). Ji-heon has a longstanding rivalry in work and love with cousin Cha Mu-won (Kim Jae-joong), as Mu-won is a mature, hardworking, and seemingly perfect executive, and the two both have a romantic history with Seo Na-yoon (Wang Ji-hye). Spunky and tough Noh Eun-seol (Choi Kang-hee) is struggling to find full-time work because of her juvenile delinquent record and poor academic background. After giving the hiring directors a piece of her mind during a job interview at DN Group, she is surprised to find herself hired by Mu-won (who was captivated by her interview) to be the secretary to Ji-heon. Determined not to be fired from her first professional job, Eun-seol works diligently at putting up with Ji-heon's childishness and keeping him in check. As their working relationship progresses, they earn each other's trust and friendship, and Eun-seol helps Ji-heon deal with his phobias and prove himself capable of becoming DN Group's successor. Things get more complicated when Ji-heon and Mu-won both fall for Eun-seol.

Cast

Main
 Ji Sung as Cha Ji-heon: A spoiled heir by his father at DN group, known to immature and hold grudges. He quickly falls in love his secretary, Noh Eun-seol though the latter is confused and not accepting of his advances when he starts to pursue her. They both eventually date later on though and get married after a series of comedic events at the end of the series.
 Choi Kang-hee as Noh Eun-seol: A hard working woman who has a sense of right and wrong, she in the series was torn by Cha Mu Won and Cha Ji Heon with her eventually dating and marrying Cha Ji-Heon with the former Mu won ending up with Seo Na Yoon, with whom she had an rivalry with, but becomes best friends, with Seo Na-yoon asking her for advice in love life with Cha Mu Won and Cha Ji Heon.
 Kim Jae-joong as Cha Mu-won: A spoiled heir and Cha Ji-Heon cousin's though less spoiled than Cha Ji Heon he is said to have troubles with his mother regarding Seo Na-yoon whom he ends up with the latter his mother had an rivalry with Na-yoon's mother at the near end of his series. Known to be sarcastic and mysterious, he ends up greatly caring for Na-yoon as she is his first love with whom he loved when she was dating Cha Ji-Heon leading Na-yoon to be torn with Cha Mu Won and Cha Ji Heon though she ends up chasing Cha Mu Won when he seems to be attracted to Noh Eun Seol. Cha Mu won though in the series, quickly develops an attraction to Noh Eun sol when Seo Na yoon rejects him due to her not wanting to make the same mistake once again but again ends up with Seo Na yoon after her multiple advances leaving him to come back to the one he has always loved. At the end of the series, both of them do not end up married but he has proposed to her though Na yoon wants to get married, he thinks she should "grow up" a bit more.
 Wang Ji-hye as Seo Na-yoon: At the start of the series she seems spoiled and like a brat. It is revealed though that she is not a brat even though she is rich, she cares deeply about the people she gets close and tends not to leave them though, she is seen to cry and be emotional with Cha Mu Won the only person who she actually truly cry around and depend on, whom she ends up with. She deeply loved and cared about both Cha Ji Heon and Cha Mu Won though she is both their ex girlfriend and due to her mistake which is not revealed in the series ends up leaving Cha Ji Heon she comes to back win over Cha Ji Heon but due to Cha Ji Heon being interested in Noh Eun Sol, she realizes her attraction and love towards Cha Mu Won who both have issues due to the treatment of both of their mothers, she ends up trying to win over Cha Mu Won in which she does win in after rejecting him. She is known to be playful when becoming friends with Noh Eun Seol in the series with whom she was originally not on exemplary terms with, she ends up moving in with Eun Seol when she becomes friends with her. In the end, she wants to marry Cha Mu Won but he thinks she needs to "grow up" a bit more. She has also been described as adorable and is weirdly loveable.

Supporting
 Park Yeong-gyu as Chairman Cha Bong-man, Ji-heon's father
 Cha Hwa-yeon as Shin Sook-hee, Mu-won's mother
 Kim Young-ok as Mrs. Song, Ji-heon and Mu-won's grandmother
 Ha Jae-sook as Lee Myung-ran, Eun-seol's best friend
 Jung Kyu-soo as Noh Bong-man, Eun-seol's father
 Kim Hyung-bum as Secretary Kim, Ji-heon's secretary
 Kim Ha-kyoon as Secretary Jang, Chairman Cha's secretary
 Kim Chung as Hwang Kwan-jang, Na-yoon's mother
 Kim Seung-wook as Park Sang-mu
 Lee Hee-won as Yang Ha-young, Mu-won's secretary

Special Appearance
 Oh Hee-joon as Office worker
 Ahn Nae-sang as loan shark (ep. 1)
 Yoon Gi-won as Na-yoon's blind date (ep. 17)
 Oh Hyun-kyung as Secretary Jang's blind date (ep. 18)

Ratings

Soundtrack
Track listing
 "우리 그냥 사랑하게 해주세요" (Please let us love) – A Pink
 "잘 알지도 못하면서" – Lyn
 "지켜줄게" (I'll protect you) – Kim Jaejoong 
 "묻는다 – 엠스트리트" - M. Street
 "그대만 보여요" (I can only see you) – Yewon of Jewelry and Hwang Kwanghee of ZE:A 
 "슬픈 노래는" (Sad song) – Heo Young-saeng 
 "너 때문에" – Hyu Woo
 "이제야 알겠어" (Now we know why) – Son Hyun-woo
 "우리 그냥 사랑하게 해주세요" (instrumental)
 "잘 알지도 못하면서" (instrumental)
 "지켜줄게" (instrumental)
 "묻는다" (instrumental)
 "그대만 보여요" (instrumental)
 "슬픈 노래는" (instrumental)
 "너 때문에" (instrumental)
 "이제야 알겠어" (instrumental)

Awards
2011 SBS Drama Awards
 Top Excellence Award, Actor in a Drama Special - Ji Sung
 Top Excellence Award, Actress in a Drama Special - Choi Kang-hee
 Best Supporting Actor in a Drama Special - Park Yeong-gyu
 Top 10 Stars - Ji Sung, Choi Kang-hee
 New Star Award - Kim Jaejoong, Wang Ji-hye
 Netizen Popularity Award, Actress - Choi Kang-hee
 Best Couple Award - Ji Sung and Choi Kang-hee
 Achievement Award - Kim Young-ok

International broadcast
 The series was popular in Japan and aired on multiple channels, including: paid satellite channels KNTV, DATV, KBS Japan, BS Japan TV, and major broadcaster TBS.
 The series airs every weeknights at 7:15pm in the Philippines via Jeepney TV under its "Asian Express" block.
 The series previously played in 8TV (Malaysia) in Malaysia.
 It aired in Vietnam on HTV3 from January 15, 2014.
 It aired in Thailand on PPTV beginning November 18, 2014.

Remake
In 2012, the TV channel "Ukraine" filmed jointly Russian-Ukrainian license remake with the same name but adapted, with the same soundtrack. The quality rating of Kinopoisk is 7,742 of 10. Popularity Rating is 6,847%  with the original rating 7,731 of 10

References

External links
 Protect the Boss official SBS website 

 

2011 South Korean television series debuts
2011 South Korean television series endings
Seoul Broadcasting System television dramas
Korean-language television shows
South Korean romantic comedy television series
South Korean action television series
Television series by AStory